This Is Who I Am is the debut studio album by Salem Al Fakir, released in January 2007.

Track listing
"Begin" - 0:56
"This Is Who I Am" - 3:28
"Tell Me" - 2:52
"Two Long Distance to Greatest Thoughts" - 2:33
"Dream Girl" - 4:27
"It's Only You" - 3:13
"Jussi" - 1:00
"Devil Look" - 4:47
"Count Me Out" -3:23
"It's True" - 3:24
"Magic Night" - 3:11
"Baroon" - 00:52
"Hymn" - 2:24
"Damien & Bob" - 1:36
"Good Song" -4:14
"Thank You" - 3:19
"End" - 3:32

Charts

References

2007 debut albums
Salem Al Fakir albums